Harbel is a town in Margibi County, Liberia. It lies along the Farmington River, about 15 miles upstream from the Atlantic Ocean. It was named for the founder of The Firestone Tire & Rubber Company, Harvey S. Firestone, and his wife, Idabelle. Since 1926, Harbel has been home to a massive natural rubber plantation which is still operated by the Firestone subsidiary of Bridgestone.

Roberts International Airport is 2 miles southwest of Harbel. 

As of the 2008 census, Harbel had a population of 25,309.

See also

Firestone Hydroelectric Project

References

Populated places in Liberia
Populated places established by Americo-Liberians
Margibi County
1926 establishments in Liberia
Populated places established in 1926